Grzegorz Bociek (born 6 June 1991) is a Polish volleyball player. At the professional club level, he plays for Cuprum Lubin, two–time Polish Champion (2016, 2017).

Personal life
Bociek was born in Sielec, Poland. He has two brothers – Łukasz, Piotr and a younger sister Monika (born 1996), who is also a volleyball player and has played in the Polish women's junior national team. On June 12, 2014 his fiancée Paulina gave birth to their daughter Alicja. On October 1, 2014 Bociek announced at a press conference that he is suspending his sports career because of a serious disease. He was suffering from a tumor of the lymphoid tissues. On October 4, 2014 he married Paulina (née Bigos). Bociek disease began with lymphadenopathy in the neck. Upon further investigation, it turned out that it was a cancer of the lymphatic system. The whole volleyball environment helped him financially and supported him, including a few Polish clubs - ZAKSA Kędzierzyn-Koźle and PGE Skra. On April 2, 2015 he announced via Facebook that recent studies have shown that he is healthy and is going back to volleyball. He got the call to the Polish national team in 2015.

Career

Clubs
Bociek moved to the club from Kędzierzyn-Koźle in June 2013. In the 2013/2014 season they won the Polish Cup. On October 1, 2014 Bociek suspended his sports career. In April 2014 came back to trainings and signed new contract with ZAKSA.

Sporting achievements

Clubs
 National championships
 2013/2014  Polish Cup, with ZAKSA Kędzierzyn-Koźle
 2015/2016  Polish Championship, with ZAKSA Kędzierzyn-Koźle
 2016/2017  Polish Cup, with ZAKSA Kędzierzyn-Koźle
 2016/2017  Polish Championship, with ZAKSA Kędzierzyn-Koźle

Universiade
 2013  Summer Universiade

References

External links
 
 Player profile at PlusLiga.pl
 Player profile at Volleybox.net

1991 births
Living people
People from Opoczno
Sportspeople from Łódź Voivodeship
Polish men's volleyball players
Universiade medalists in volleyball
Medalists at the 2013 Summer Universiade
Universiade silver medalists for Poland
Skra Bełchatów players
AZS Częstochowa players
ZAKSA Kędzierzyn-Koźle players
Warta Zawiercie players
Gwardia Wrocław players
Cuprum Lubin players
Opposite hitters